John Jakob Mendelson (July 1917 – 20 May 1978) was a British Labour Party politician.

Mendelson was educated at the London School of Economics and became a university lecturer in political science. He was vice-president of Sheffield Trades and Labour Council.

Mendelson was the Member of Parliament for Penistone, South Yorkshire from a 1959 by-election until his death, and served on the Public Accounts Committee. It was Mendelson who introduced Tony Benn to the radical history of the Diggers and the Levellers, on which Benn drew from the 1970s onwards.

Mendelson's successor at the subsequent by-election was Allen McKay.

References

Times Guide to the House of Commons October 1974

External links
 

1917 births
1978 deaths
Labour Party (UK) MPs for English constituencies
UK MPs 1955–1959
UK MPs 1959–1964
UK MPs 1964–1966
UK MPs 1966–1970
UK MPs 1970–1974
UK MPs 1974
UK MPs 1974–1979
Alumni of the London School of Economics
Politics of Penistone
Jewish British politicians
English Jews